Aríñez or Ariñiz (Ariz in Basque) is a village in Álava, Basque Country, Spain. 
It is part of the Victorian Southwest Rural Zone, and it has 116 inhabitants.
Aríñez lies 8.5 km West of Vitoria-Gasteiz, next to the A-102 highway, a branch of the A-1 (Madrid-Irún) expressway. Its most representative building is the San Julián y Santa Basilisa Parochial Church, which combines the renaissance and baroque styles. These saints' celebrations take place on the 9th of January, and Saint Thomas's celebrations take place on the 21st of December.

Aríñez Municipality
This was an old municipality, which used to gather the villages of Aríñez, Margarita and Esquíbel. In 1928 the municipality was absorbed by the Victoria Municipality. The population before annexation was 300 inhabitants.

References 

Populated places in Álava